Smile is the third studio album from Simon Webbe. The album was released on 13 October 2017. The album is the first collection of solo material from Webbe in a decade.

Discussing the meaning behind the album title, Webbe told Entertainment Focus: "The album is called Smile because not a lot of people are smiling these days. Everybody's too busy using their phones to connect, nobody's really connecting anymore. For me, I just wanted to put a title out there that was self-explanatory and will hit home."

The album is inspired by Webbe's fiancé Ashen Kemal, to whom he proposed on Valentine's Day 2017.

The album hit number 76 in the midweek UK Album Chart Update, however ultimately failed to chart in the Top 100.

Singles
"Nothing Without You" was released digitally on 12 July 2017 as the album's lead single.

"Flashback" was released as the second single from the album on 11 September 2017.

Track listing

References

2017 albums
Simon Webbe albums